Raining in the Mountain is a 1979 film written and directed by King Hu. The film was selected as the Hong Kong entry for the Best Foreign Language Film at the 52nd Academy Awards, but was not accepted as a nominee.

Synopsis
The story of a secluded Ming Dynasty monastery which rests on a mountain. A corrupt general and an ambitious esquire arrive there and quickly employ martial artists to help steal a sacred handwritten scroll of Tripitaka hidden in the monastery's library. Meanwhile, the abbot of the monastery looks for a successor, and he sets his sight on a man falsely accused by the corrupt general of being a thief and condemned some time ago. The man has just been released from prison and comes to the monastery to seek a peaceful life. The abbot names the former convict as his successor, and this action sets in motion a series of betrayals and murders in the struggle for the invaluable Tripitaka scroll.

Cast
Cast adapted from the 2020 Masters of Cinema blu-ray.

Location

The filming of Raining in the Mountain was virtually all carried out in and around the 8th century Bulguksa Buddhist temple, a UNESCO World Heritage site in south-eastern South Korea. This was one of two films made by Hu in Korea in 1979. The other was Legend of the Mountain.

Release
Raining in the Mountain was released in 1979. It was released for the first time in the UK on Blu-ray and DVD in Eureka's 'Masters of Cinema range, in February 2020.

Reception
Retrospective reception of the film in Hong Kong is positive. At the 24th Hong Kong Film Awards various Asian film critics, film makers and actors voted for the top Chinese films from Hong Kong, Taiwan and China. Raining in the Mountain was listed at 59th place on the list. The New York Times hailed the 2020 restoration of the film "spectacular, exhilarating entertainment." Philip Kemp of Sight & Sound praised the film stating that "much of the film is breathtakingly beautiful, especially the wordless three-minute opening sequence" and that as the films "screenwriter, art director, editor as well as director, [King Hu] scored an impressive achievement."

Awards and nominations

See also
 List of submissions to the 52nd Academy Awards for Best Foreign Language Film
 List of Hong Kong submissions for the Academy Award for Best Foreign Language Film

References

Sources

External links
 
 
 Raining in the Mountain at Cinemasie

1979 films
1970s Mandarin-language films
Taiwanese action drama films
Hong Kong action drama films
Films directed by King Hu
Films set in monasteries
1970s Hong Kong films